Whale vocalizations are the sounds made by whales to communicate. The word "song" is used in particular to describe the pattern of regular and predictable sounds made by some species of whales (notably the humpback) in a way that is reminiscent of human singing.

Humans produce sound by expelling air through the larynx. The vocal cords within the larynx open and close as necessary to separate the stream of air into discrete pockets of air. These pockets are shaped by the throat, tongue, and lips into the desired sound.

Cetacean sound production differs markedly from this mechanism. The precise mechanism differs in the two major suborders of cetaceans: the Odontoceti (toothed whales—including dolphins) and the Mysticeti (baleen whales—including the largest whales, such as the blue whale).


Blue whale (Balaenoptera musculus) 

Estimates made by Cummings and Thompson (1971) and Richardson et al. (1995) suggest that source level of sounds made by blue whales are between 155 and 188 decibels with reference to one micropascal metre. All blue whale groups make calls at a fundamental frequency of between 10 and 40 Hz, and the lowest frequency sound a human can typically perceive is 20 Hz. Blue whale calls last between ten and thirty seconds. Additionally blue whales off the coast of Sri Lanka have been recorded repeatedly making "songs" of four notes duration lasting about two minutes each, reminiscent of the well-known humpback whale songs.

All of the baleen whale sound files on this page (with the exception of the humpback vocalizations) are reproduced at 10x speed to bring the sound into the human auditory band.

Vocalizations produced by the Eastern North Pacific population have been well studied. This population produces long-duration, low frequency pulses ("A") and tonal calls ("B"), upswept tones that precede type B calls ("C"), moderate-duration downswept tones ("D"), and variable amplitude-modulated and frequency-modulated sounds. A and B calls are often produced in repeated co-occurring sequences as song only by males, suggesting a reproductive function. D calls are produced by both sexes during social interactions while foraging and may considered multi-purpose contact calls. Because the calls have also been recorded from blue whale trios from in a putative reproductive context, it has been recently suggested that this call has different functions. The blue whale call recorded off Sri Lanka is a three‐unit phrase. The first unit is a pulsive call ranging 19.8 to 43.5 Hz, lasting 17.9 ± 5.2 s. The second unit is an FM upsweep 55.9 to 72.4 Hz lasting 13.8 ± 1.1 s. The final unit is a long (28.5 ± 1.6 s) tone that sweeps from 108 to 104.7 Hz. The blue whale call recorded off Madagascar, a two‐unit phrase, starts with 5–7 pulses with a center frequency of 35.1 ± 0.7 Hz and duration of 4.4 ± 0.5 s followed by a 35 ± 0 Hz tone lasting 10.9 ± 1.1 s. In the Southern Ocean, blue whales calls last roughly 18 seconds and consist of a 9-s-long, 27 Hz tone, followed by a 1-s downsweep to 19 Hz, and another downsweep to 18 Hz. They also produce short, 1–4 s duration, frequency-modulated calls ranging in frequency between 80 and 38 Hz.

At least seven blue whale song types have been shifting linearly downward in tonal frequency over time, though at different rates.

The Eastern North Pacific blue whale tonal frequency is 31% lower than it was in the early 1960s. The frequency of pygmy blue whales in the Antarctic has steadily decreased at a rate of a few tenths of hertz per year since 2002. One hypothesis is that as blue whale populations recover from whaling, this is increasing sexual selection pressure (i.e., lower frequency indicates larger body size).

Fin whale (Balaenoptera physalus) 

Like other whales, the male fin whale has been observed to make long, loud, low-frequency sounds.  Most sounds are frequency-modulated (FM) down-swept infrasonic pulses from 16 to 40 hertz frequency (the range of sounds that most humans can hear falls between 20 hertz and 20 kilohertz). Each sound lasts between one and two seconds, and various combinations of sounds occur in patterned sequences lasting 7 to 15 minutes each.  These sequences are then repeated in bouts lasting up to many days.

Humpback whale (Megaptera novaeangliae) 

The humpback whale is well known for its long and complex song. Humpbacks repeat patterns of low notes that vary in amplitude and frequency in consistent patterns over a period of hours or even days. Only male humpbacks sing, so it was at first assumed that the songs were solely for courting.  While the primary purpose of whale song may be to attract females, it is almost certain that whale song serves myriad purposes.

Orca (killer whale) (Orcinus orca)

As with other dolphins, orcas are very vocal animals. They produce a variety of clicks and whistles that are used for communication and echolocation. The vocalization types vary with activity. While resting they are much quieter, merely emitting an occasional call that is distinct from those heard when engaging in more active behaviour.

Fish-eating resident groups of orcas in the Northeast Pacific tend to be much more vocal than transient groups living in the same waters. Scientists surmise that the main reason for this lies in the different hearing abilities of their prey. Resident killer whales feed on fish, particularly Pacific salmon, a prey with poor underwater hearing that cannot detect killer whale calls at any significant distance. Transient orcas on the other hand feed mainly on marine mammals (primarily seals, sea lions, porpoises and dolphins) and occasionally on seabirds. Because all marine mammals have excellent underwater hearing, transients probably remain silent for much of the time to avoid detection by their acoustically-sensitive prey. For the same reason, mammal-hunting orcas tend to restrict their echolocation, occasionally using just a single click (called a cryptic click) rather than the long train of clicks observed in other populations.

Minke whale (Balaenoptera spp.)

See also

 52-hertz whale

References

Whale songs
Whale sounds